The following lists the top 100 singles of 1998 in Australia from the Australian Recording Industry Association (ARIA) End of Year singles chart.

"The Cup of Life/María" by Ricky Martin was the biggest song of the year, peaking at #1 for six weeks and staying in the top 50 for 27 weeks.  The longest stay at #1 was by Aerosmith with "I Don't Want to Miss a Thing" which spent nine weeks at the top spot.

Notes

References

Australian record charts
1998 in Australian music
1998 record charts